The Big 12 Conference Men's Basketball Coach of the Year is a basketball award given to the most outstanding men's basketball head coach in the Big 12 Conference, as chosen by a panel of sports writers and broadcasters. The award was first given following the 1996–97 season, the first year of the conference's existence, to Kansas Jayhawks head coach Roy Williams.

As of 2020, current Kansas Jayhawks head coach Bill Self has won the award six times, leading the league. Four other head coaches, have won the award twice. The voting finished in a tie in 2011–12, with Self and Iowa State Cyclones head coach Fred Hoiberg sharing honors.

Three coaches have won Big 12 Conference Coach of the Year in the same season that they have also won a National Coach of the Year Award, Roy Williams, Larry Eustachy and Bill Self. The Kansas Jayhawks has the most Big 12 Conference Coach of the Year Awards with six while the Texas Longhorns are second with four. The only schools who have never had a coach win are Oklahoma, and TCU, as well as former Big 12 schools Colorado, Missouri, and Nebraska.

Key

Winners

Winners by school

See also
Big 12 Conference Men's Basketball Player of the Year
List of coaches in the Naismith Memorial Basketball Hall of Fame

References
General
 Go to page 11 for the list of winners.

Specific

NCAA Division I men's basketball conference coaches of the year
Coach
Awards established in 1997